Mythological Chinese rivers are an important motif in Chinese mythology, forming part of a mythological geography. Among mythological Chinese rivers are:

 Weak River or Weak Water: a river or body of such low specific gravity that no one can swim nor anything float, not even a feather
 Red River or Red Water: one of the colored rivers flowing from Kunlun. In his poem "Li Sao", Qu Yuan crosses it on a bridge formed by dragons which he summons for the purpose
 White River or White Water: one of the colored rivers flowing from Kunlun
 Black River or Black Water: one of the colored rivers flowing from Kunlun
Yellow River: a colored river flowing from mount Kunlun. Often identified with the real Yellow River. Once drunk dry by Kua Fu and also said to have been ruled by the deity He Bo
 Yellow Springs: another name for Hell

See also

References 
Barrett, T. H. 2008. The Woman Who Discovered Printing. New Haven: Yale University Press. 
Christie, Anthony (1968). Chinese Mythology. Feltham: Hamlyn Publishing. 
Ferguson, John C. 1928. "China" in Volume VIII of Mythology of All Races. Archaeological Institute of America. <archive.org> 
Hawkes, David, translator and introduction (2011 [1985]). Qu Yuan et al., The Songs of the South: An Ancient Chinese Anthology of Poems by Qu Yuan and Other Poets. London: Penguin Books. 
Latourette, Kenneth Scott The Chinese: Their History and Culture (Third Edition, Revised), 1947. New York: Macmillan.
Legge, James, translator and "Introduction". The I Ching: The Book of Changes Second Edition. New York: Dover 1963 (1899). Library of Congress 63-19508
Paludan, Ann (1998). Chronicle of the Chinese Emperors: The Reign-by-Reign Record of the Rulers of Imperial China. New York, New York: Thames and Hudson. 

Schafer, Edward H. (1963) The Golden Peaches of Samarkand. Berkeley: University of California Press.
Sheppard, Odell. 1930. The Lore of the Unicorn -- Myths and Legends.
Siu, R. G. H. 1968. The Man of Many Qualities: A Legacy of the I Ching, "Preface" and "Introduction". Cambridge: Michigan Institute of Technology Press. LoCccn 68-18242.
Strassberg, Richard E., editor, translator, and comments. 2002 [2018]. A Chinese Bestiary: Strange Creatures from the GUIDEWAYS THROUGH MOUNTAINS AND SEAS. Berkeley and Los Angeles: University of California Press. 

Werner, E. T. C. (1994 [1922]). Myths and Legends of China. New York: Dover Publications. 
Wu, K. C. (1982). The Chinese Heritage. New York: Crown Publishers. .
Yang, Lihui and Deming An, with Jessica Anderson Turner (2005). Handbook of Chinese Mythology. New York: Oxford University Press.

External links 
Encyclopedia of Chinese Gods and Goddesses
Ferguson, John C. 1928. "China" in Volume VIII of Mythology of All Races. Archaeological Institute of America. <archive.org> 
Guide to Chinese gods
Chinese myths online
Collection of images from Chinese mythology
中国行业神崇拜

Mythological rivers